

Kasaragod  
Government funded

 ICAR-Central Plantation Crops Research Institute
 Central University of Kerala

Kannur 
Government funded

Kannur University
Pepper Research Station, Panniyur (Kerala Agricultural University)
Malabar Cancer Centre, Thalassery (MCC)

Wayanad 
Others
M. S. Swaminathan Research Foundation, Community Agrobiodiversity Centre, Meppadi

Kozhikode 
Government funded
 ICAR-Central Marine Fisheries Research Institute, Calicut Research Centre, West Hill P.O, Kozhikode
 ICAR- Indian Institute of Spices Research (IISR), Vellimadukunnu, Kozhikode
Zoological Survey of India (ZSI), Western Ghat Research Center (WGRC) Calicut
KSCSTE- Centre for Water Resources Development and Management (CWRDM)
 KSCSTE- Kerala School of Mathematics (KSoM), Kunnamangalam, Kerala
 KSCSTE- The Malabar Botanical Garden and Institute for Plant Sciences (MBGIPS)
Indian Institute of Management Kozhikode, Kunnamangalam, Kerala
National Institute of Technology Calicut (NITC)
 Government Medical College, Kozhikode
 The Multidisciplinary Research Unit (MRU), Govt Medical College, Kozhikode
Institute of Mental Health and Neuroscience, Kozhikode
 ULRC, ULCCS Research Centre, UL CyberPark, Kozhikode

Malappuram 
Government funded
University of Calicut, Thenjipalam
 KSCSTE- Kerala Forest Research Institute (KFRI), Sub center, Nilambur

Palakkad 
Government funded
Indian Institute of Technology, Palakkad (IIT-P), Kanjikode
 Institute of Integrative Medical Sciences (Government Medical College, Palakkad)

Others

 IRTC - Integrated Rural Technology Centre, Mundur

Thrissur
Government funded
Kerala Veterinary and Animal Sciences University (KVASU), Mannuthy
KSCSTE- Kerala Forest Research Institute (KFRI), Peechi
Kerala Kalamandalam, Cheruthuruthy1

Kottayam
Government funded

Mahatma Gandhi University
Centre for Mathematical and Statistical Sciences, Pala

Alapuzha
Government funded

National Institute of Virology (NIV) Kerala unit, Alappuzh

Kollam
Government funded
 Corporate Research Centre, Indian Rare Earths Ltd

Thiruvananthapuram
Government funded

University of Kerala, Thiruvananthapuram
APJ Abdul Kalam Technological University
ISRO - The Vikram Sarabhai Space Centre (VSSC), Kochuveli
ISRO - Liquid Propulsion Systems Centre (LPSC), Valiamala
ISRO - Inertial Systems Unit (IISU), Vattiyoorkavu
IAV- Institute of Advanced Virology,Bio 360 lifescience park,Thonakkal,Thiruvananthapuram
Indian Institute of Space Science and Technology (IIST), Valiamala
 CSIR- National Institute for Interdisciplinary Science and Technology, Pappanamcode
Indian Institute of Science Education and Research, Thiruvananthapuram
Rajiv Gandhi Centre for Biotechnology, Poojapurra, Akkulam
National Centre for Earth Science Studies, Akkulam
Sree Chitra Tirunal Institute for Medical Sciences & Technology, Medical College and Poojapurra
Biomedical Technology Wing, Sree Chitra Tirunal Institute for Medical Sciences & Technology, Poojapurra
Achuta Menon Center for Health Science Studies, Sree Chitra Tirunal Institute for Medical Sciences & Technology, Medical College
Regional Cancer Centre, Thiruvananthapuram, Medical College
Government Medical College, Thiruvananthapuram
 Multidisciplinary Research Unit (MRU), Govt. Medical College, Thiruvananthapuram
National Institute of Speech and Hearing, Akkulam
KSCSTE-Jawaharlal Nehru Tropical Botanic Garden and Research Institute (KSCSTE - JNTBGRI), Palode
KSCSTE- Institute of Advanced Virology (IAV), Kerala,  Thonnakkal
KSCSTE - National Transportation Planning and Research Centre (NATPAC)
ICAR - Central Tuber Crops Research Institute, Sreekariyam
Centre for Development Studies, Ulloor
 The Centre for Development of Advanced Computing,(C-DAC), Vellayamabalam
Indian Institute of Information Technology and Management, Kerala, Technopark
Centre for Mathematical and Statistical Sciences, Trivandrum campus
College of Engineering, Trivandrum (APJ Abdul Kalam Technological University)

Research institutes in Kerala
Kerala